The Samsung Focus 2 (also known as the SGH-i667 and Samsung Mandel) is a slate smartphone which runs Microsoft's Windows Phone operating system. It features a 1.4 GHz Qualcomm Snapdragon processor, a 4.0-inch Super AMOLED Pentile screen, and 8GB of internal storage.

See also
 Samsung Focus
 Samsung Focus S
 Windows Phone

References

External links

Windows Phone devices
Samsung smartphones
Mobile phones introduced in 2012